Mark Freedman (born November 19, 1958) is an American former professional tennis player.

A native of New York, Freedman played collegiate tennis for the University of Michigan, then competed on the professional tour in the early 1980s.

Freedman qualified for the singles main draw of the 1982 Australian Open and after a first-round bye, fell to sixth seed Hank Pfister. As a doubles player he also featured in the main draws of the French Open and Wimbledon.

References

External links
 
  (duplicate profile)
 

1958 births
Living people
American male tennis players
Michigan Wolverines men's tennis players
Tennis people from New York (state)
People from Larchmont, New York